Marko Kmetec (born 13 January 1976) is a retired Slovenian footballer who played as a forward.

Kmetec had spells with a number of Slovenian clubs, and his only stint abroad was with the Cypriot club Ethnikos Achna, where he played between 2004 and 2007. Kmetec was also the Slovenian PrvaLiga top scorer in the 2002–03 season.

References

External links
Marko Kmetec profile at NZS 

1976 births
Living people
People from Ptuj
Slovenian footballers
Association football forwards
NK Drava Ptuj players
NK Aluminij players
NK Mura players
NK Maribor players
NK Olimpija Ljubljana (1945–2005) players
NK Korotan Prevalje players
NK Ljubljana players
Ethnikos Achna FC players
ND Mura 05 players
Slovenian expatriate footballers
Slovenian expatriate sportspeople in Cyprus
Expatriate footballers in Cyprus
Slovenian PrvaLiga players
Slovenian Second League players
Cypriot First Division players